Flowable is an open-source workflow engine written in Java that can execute business processes described in BPMN 2.0. It is an actively maintained fork of Activiti (software).

History 
In October 2016, the lead developers of Activiti (software) left Alfresco (software) and started the Flowable Open Source project based on a fork of Activiti code.

The first version of Flowable was 5.22, based on a fork of Activiti 5.21, but added Transient Variables. The first release of Flowable version 6.0 was based on a fork of Activiti version 6 beta 4. Version 6 of the Flowable engine includes a rewrite of the core process virtual machine.

Components 
The project comprises a set of modules that can operate together:
 BPMN Engine, the core Business Process Model and Notation workflow processor
 CMMN Engine, a Case Management Model and Notation processor
 DMN Engine, an implementation of a subset of Decision Model and Notation based business rules
 Forms Engine, a forms service that can be used in conjunction with the Tasks web app or a custom application
 Modeler, a web-based graphical authoring interface for editing BPMN, DMN and forms models
 Designer, an Eclipse plug-in for designing BPMN models
 IDM, an example web tool to manage user and group identities and privileges
 Tasks, an example web application to start processes, view task queues, tasks and forms

Differences between Version 5 and Version 6 
The key changes in Flowable 6 are:
 Abstract persistence layer, enabling use of relational or non-relational data sources
 1-to-1 mapping of BPMN model to executable instruction set
 Simplified execution tree, enabling easier analysis and manipulation of in-flight processes
 Single agenda for process execution plans
 Queue-based job execution
 Ad hoc Sub Processes
 Dynamic process execution

References

Workflow applications